The Hempest is an American eco-friendly clothing store specializing in hemp clothing, products, and accessories. The store was founded in 1995 in Boston, Massachusetts, which makes it the oldest cannabis shop in Massachusetts. The foundation of the store was a conviction to "bringing hemp back to the marketplace and into full view of the public". Though the stores typically work together, each is independent from one another. 

The mission of the store has been to continually educate the public on the hypocrisy of the drug war while at the same time providing eco-friendly fashion alternatives made from Hemp. The Hempest has been educating Boston and selling books about CBD since 1997. The Massachusetts campaigned heavily for legalized Medicinal and recreational Cannabis, and worked directly with Marijuana Policy Project in fundraising efforts and signature drives.

Store History
Boston, Massachusetts, opened December 1995 on Huntington Avenue, moved July 1997 to Newbury Street
Burlington, Vermont, opened July 2000, Closed November 2015
Northampton, Massachusetts, opened October 2001
Cambridge, Massachusetts, opened April 2006 in Harvard Square closed 2020
Bellingham, Washington, opened December 2007, closed December 2009
Online Store Opened April 2004

References

External links
 Official website

Clothing retailers of the United States
Retail companies established in 1995
Hemp companies
Privately held companies based in Massachusetts
Cannabis in Massachusetts
Cannabis companies of the United States
1995 in cannabis